Driving Force is a 1989 action film directed by A.J. Prowse.

Plot
A widower (Sam Jones) and his girlfriend (Catherine Bach) stop tow-truck drivers of the future who boost business with accidents.

Cast
 Sam J. Jones as Steve 
 Catherine Bach as Harry 
 Don Swayze as Nelson
 Stephanie Mason as Becky
 Ancel Cook as Pete
 Gerald Gordon as John
 Renata Scott as Leslie
 Robert Marius as "Surf"
 Billy Blanks as Pool 
 Michael Joiner as Black Night Mechanic

References

External links

1989 films
1989 action films
Films shot in the Philippines
American action films
1980s English-language films
Films directed by Andrew Prowse
1980s American films